III Tactical Air Division may refer to:

 The IV Air Support Command, designated III Tactical Air Division from September 1943 to April 1944
 The III Reconnaissance Command, designated III Tactical Air Division from April 1944 to June 1945

Divisions of the United States Army Air Forces